Biruwa Archale  is a village development committee in Syangja District in the Gandaki Zone of central Nepal. At the time of the 2011 Nepal census it had a population of 2860 people living in 674 individual households. ward no. 1 Dara/Besardada village is 100% Gurung Village. While the other Ward No. 2 Shree Danda and the remaining Ward No. 3-9 consists of Magar, Chhetri and Brahmins.

References

External links
UN map of the municipalities of Syangja District

Populated places in Syangja District